Hepatocellular carcinoma, down-regulated 1 is a protein that in humans is encoded by the HEPN1 gene.

Function

This gene is expressed in the liver, and encodes a short peptide that is localized predominantly to the cytoplasm. Transient transfection studies showed that expression of this gene significantly inhibited cell growth, and it may have a role in apoptosis. Expression of this gene is downregulated or lost in hepatocellular carcinomas (HCC), suggesting that loss of this gene is involved in carcinogenesis of hepatocytes. Also to note is that this gene maps to the 3'-noncoding region of HEPACAM gene (GeneID:220296) on the antisense strand.

References

Further reading